Ekaterini Thanou (born 1 February 1975), also known as Katerina Thanou, is a Greek former sprinter. She won numerous medals in the 100 metres, including an Olympic silver medal at the 2000 Summer Olympics in Sydney, Australia, while she was the 2002 European champion in Munich, Germany. She had also been crowned world and European champion in the 60 metres at the indoor championships.

In 2007, Marion Jones, who won in the 100 metres at the 2000 Olympics leaving Thanou in the second place, admitted that she had used steroids and her gold medal was withdrawn by the International Olympic Committee, but was not reallocated to Thanou due to the fact that she was also involved in doping.

Suspension 
For the 2004 Summer Olympics, Thanou was one of the main hopes of the home crowd for winning an athletics medal. However, on the day prior to the opening ceremony, Thanou and her training partner Konstantinos Kenteris failed to attend a drugs test, and later the same night were hospitalised, claiming they had both been injured in a motorcycle accident. In the ensuing doping scandal, Kenteris and Thanou announced their withdrawal from the Games on 18 August after a hearing before the Disciplinary Commission of the IOC, for what they described to be "in the interests of the country." An official Greek investigation into their alleged accident ruled that it had been staged and the pair were criminally charged with making false statements to authorities.

The missed test in Athens was the duo's third violation of the summer and they were consequently provisionally suspended by the IAAF on 22 December 2004. In June 2005, however, the athletes were cleared of all charges by the Greek athletics federation. Their coach Christos Tsekos was blamed for the missed tests and suspended for four years, but was cleared on separate allegations of distributing banned substances. After a long legal battle, on 26 June 2006 prior to a final ruling by the Court of Arbitration for Sport, the athletes reached an out of court settlement with the IAAF accepting anti-doping rule violations of 3 missed tests between 27 July and 12 August 2004 (in breach of Rule 32.2(d)) and a failure to provide a urine and a blood sample on 12 August 2004 (in breach of Rule 32.2(c)). In return, the more serious charges against them, those of evasion and refusal to provide a sample, were dropped. They have been eligible to compete since 22 December 2006.

Return from suspension

On her return to international competition at the European Athletics Indoor Championships in Birmingham, England, she was booed by the crowds before finishing sixth in the final of 60 metres with 7.26.

Following the revelations about Marion Jones's use of steroids, Thanou, who finished 2nd behind Jones in the 100 m at Sydney 2000, was in line to be awarded the American's gold medal, but due to Thanou's own tainted record the IOC, after two years of deliberation, opted to punish Jones without rewarding Thanou. Jones' gold medal was withdrawn but was withheld by the IOC, Thanou remaining a silver medallist.

Thanou was provisionally selected by the Hellenic Olympic Committee to compete at the 2008 Summer Olympics in Beijing. She had not achieved the Olympic 'A' standard (11.32 seconds), but as no other Greek woman had achieved this, she was selected as part of the team.

However, all of this became moot on 9 August 2008, when the executive board of the IOC decided to bar Thanou from competing under rule 23.2.1 of the Olympic charter. This rule allows the banning of athletes who are thought to be guilty of improper conduct or bringing the games into disrepute. Thanou claimed that she faced "intense pressure" to withdraw from the Beijing Olympics, four years after being involved in a major doping controversy at the Athens Games. Thanou qualified for the Beijing Games, and although she had threatened to sue Jacques Rogge, the IOC president, she was finally denied permission to participate.

Conviction and subsequent acquittal
Thanou was tried in 2009 for making false statements to police, to avoid a doping test, on the eve of the 2004 Athens Olympics. On May 9, 2011, Thanou and Kenteris were convicted of perjury and received suspended sentences of 31 months against which they immediately appealed. The judge declared that the "motor accident at the Olympic Games in reality had never taken place". On 6 September 2011, the Guardian newspaper reported that Kostas Kenteris and Katerina Thanou had been acquitted by a Greek appeals court of faking a motorcycle crash after missing a drugs test.

Personal bests

International competitions

See also
List of doping cases in athletics

Notes

References

External links
Official website

1975 births
Living people
Greek female sprinters
Olympic athletes of Greece
Athletes (track and field) at the 2000 Summer Olympics
Olympic silver medalists for Greece
Greek sportspeople in doping cases
Doping cases in athletics
World Athletics Championships medalists
European Athletics Championships medalists
Medalists at the 2000 Summer Olympics
Olympiacos Athletics athletes
World Athletics Championships athletes for Greece
World Athletics Indoor Championships winners
Olympic silver medalists in athletics (track and field)
Greek European Athletics champions (track and field)
Universiade medalists in athletics (track and field)
Mediterranean Games gold medalists for Greece
Mediterranean Games silver medalists for Greece
Mediterranean Games medalists in athletics
Athletes (track and field) at the 1997 Mediterranean Games
Universiade gold medalists for Greece
Universiade silver medalists for Greece
Medalists at the 1995 Summer Universiade
Medalists at the 1997 Summer Universiade
Olympic female sprinters
Athletes from Athens